Marco Taddei Né (born 17 July 1983) is an Ivorian former football midfielder.

Career
Né had a pre-season trial period with Arsenal F.C. in 2004 along with fellow Ivorian player Emmanuel Eboué, but unlike Eboué, Né failed to secure a transfer to the Premiership side.

He was signed by Olympiacos C.F.P. to replace Yaya Touré, who departed for AS Monaco, but failed to break into the first team due to constant injury problems for the majority of his spell at the club. Failing to leave an impression, Né was released by Olympiacos C.F.P. in the winter transfer period of 2008.

On 22 January 2009 Né signed a three-year contract with FC Kuban Krasnodar. In February he received a knee injury and missed the entire season.

References

External links

Profile on Uefa.com

1983 births
Living people
Ivorian footballers
Ivorian expatriate footballers
ASEC Mimosas players
K.S.K. Beveren players
Olympiacos F.C. players
Beerschot A.C. players
Expatriate footballers in Greece
Ivorian expatriate sportspeople in Greece
Expatriate footballers in Belgium
Ivorian expatriate sportspeople in Belgium
FC Kuban Krasnodar players
Expatriate footballers in Russia
Belgian Pro League players
Super League Greece players
Russian Premier League players
Ukrainian Premier League players
SC Tavriya Simferopol players
Footballers from Abidjan
Ivorian expatriate sportspeople in Ukraine
Expatriate footballers in Ukraine
Association football midfielders
Ivory Coast international footballers